De Luca, De Luca and Di Luca are common Italian surnames, derived from the Latin name Lucas.

De Luca may refer to:

People
 Anthony M. DeLuca, Democratic member of the Pennsylvania House of Representatives
Cateno De Luca, Italian politician
 Ciro de Luca, Austrian comedian and actor
 Danilo Di Luca, Italian cyclist
 Erri De Luca, Italian author
 Fănică Luca, Romanian musician
 Frank Deluca, Italian-American mobster
 Chiara de Luca, French-Italian actress
 Danilo Di Luca, former Italian professional road racing cyclist
 Fred De Luca, US-American entrepreneur
 George DeLuca, American lawyer, banker and politician
 Gherasim Luca, Romanian poet and painter
 Giorgio DeLuca, American entrepreneur
 Giuseppe de Luca, Italian baritone
 Guerrino De Luca, Italian-American entrepreneur
 Jeff De Luca, American software-developer
 Joseph Deluca, Italian-American mobster
 Libero de Luca, Swiss tenor
 Loes Luca, Dutch actress and comedian
 Marco De Luca, Italian race walker
 Michael DeLuca, American movie producer and screenwriter
 Nick De Luca, Scottish rugby union player
 Nick DeLuca, American football player
 Olmstead Luca, Americo-Liberian composer
 Roxana Luca, Romanian figure skater
 Vasile Luca, Romanian politician

See also
 Luca (given name)
 Luca (disambiguation)
 DeLuca (surname)

Italian-language surnames
Romanian-language surnames
Patronymic surnames